LY-266,097 is a research ligand which acts as a potent and selective antagonist for the 5-HT2B receptor, with more than 100x selectivity over the related 5-HT2A and 5-HT2C receptor subtypes. It has been used to study the role of the 5-HT2B receptor in modulating dopamine release in the brain, as well as its involvement in other processes such as allodynia.

References 

Serotonin receptor antagonists
Tryptamines
Chlorobenzenes